Stephen James Parrish (born 24 February 1953 in Cambridge, England) also known as "Stavros", is a British former professional motorcycle and truck racer, who is now a motorsport television commentator and speaker/entertainer.

Racing career
Parrish turned professional at the age of 22 in 1976, winning the ACU Solo title in the British Motor Cycle Championship. He was a team mate to Barry Sheene on a Suzuki RG 500 in the 1977 500 cc world championship, finishing fifth overall, but returned to British-based riding to become the 1978 500cc ACU 'Gold Star' Champion. He also won the British Shell 500 title in both 1979 and 1980, and a British Superbike title in 1981.

Team management
After retiring from motorcycle racing in 1986, Parrish led a dual career both managing a successful Yamaha factory team to three British Superbike championship titles; and starting a successful truck racing career, winning the 1987 British Open Truck Racing Championship. Parrish took both the European and British Truck Racing championship titles in 1990, then held the British title for four years and retained the European title for three years driving for the BP-Mercedes Benz team. Parrish regained the prestigious European crown again in 1996 in Jarama. The most successful truck racer ever, he retired in 2002 at the age of 47 to hand over to Terry Rymer.

Career highlights
 1976: Winner, British Solo Championship
 1975: Winner, Grovewood Award, Best Young Rider, Motorcycles
 1977: 5th, 500cc World Motorcycle Championship
 1978: Winner, 500cc ACU 'Gold Star' Championship
 1979: Winner, 500cc Shellsport Motorcycle Championship
 1981: Winner, British Superbike Championship
 1987: Winner, British Open Truck Racing Championship
 1989: 2nd, British Open Truck Racing Championship
 1990: Winner, European and British Truck Racing Championship
 1991: Winner, British Open Truck Racing Championship
 1992: Winner, European and British Truck Racing Championship
 1993: Winner, European and British Truck Racing Championship
 1994: Winner, European Truck Racing Championship
 1995: 2nd, European Truck Racing Championship
 1996: Winner, European Truck Racing Championship
 1997: 8th, European Truck Racing Championship
 1998: 5th, European Truck Racing Championship
 1999: 4th, European Truck Racing Championship
 2000: 5th, European Truck Racing Championship
 2001: 6th, European Truck Racing Championship

Commentary career
Steve provides commentary and analysis for ITV's week-long coverage of the Isle of Man TT, alongside former racer James Whitham, shown on Velocity Channel in the US.

In 1985, Parrish started commentating for the BBC radio, and then transferring to television with Sky with Barry Nutley. From 1990, he commentated on the British 125 championship for the BBC. 

Parrish was previously co commentator on World Superbikes for the BBC with Leigh Diffey.

Parrish then teamed up with Charlie Cox commentating on MotoGP coverage, until the BBC lost its contract at the end of 2013. The pair had a rapport and commentated on a number of series for the BBC from the late 1990s, which were British and World Superbikes and MotoGP. A qualified pilot, Parrish is also a commentator for the Red Bull Air Race series for Channel 4.

Other work and achievements
Away from television, he regularly tests various vehicles and racing machines, and is an expert witness for motor racing incidents. Parrish holds the Guinness Book of Records world record for the "Fastest Speed Achieved in Reverse" (85 mph) using a Caterham car.

With journalist and broadcaster Nick Harris, Parrish co-authored Barry: The Story of Motorcycling Legend Barry Sheene (2008), a biography of his former team mate Barry Sheene.

Personality
A notorious practical joker, Parrish is known to have carried out various pranks.

He is permanently banned from the Chinese administrative region of Macau after setting off a home-made bomb outside a brothel. Several of his fellow riders were being 'serviced' inside at the time.
He burnt down a toilet block in Finland.
He once posed as a medical doctor to allow John Hopkins to fly from Japan to the Australian GP.
He upset his fellow village residents by registering PEN 15 as his car number plate.
He once sabotaged a Mini Moke belonging to Team Bike, (a group of benefactors, mechanics, racers, journalists and helpers) by undoing every single wheel-nut to the last thread, in a revenge prank. The prank was discovered shortly before the vehicle was going to be driven off.
He once posed as Barry Sheene in a qualifying session when the two were team-mates, as Sheene had turned up to the session with a hangover. Parrish put on Sheene's helmet/overalls and qualified on his behalf, then put his own clothing back on and qualified further down the grid as himself.
Parrish owns an ambulance and has been seen using the ambulance to park on double yellow lines with the doors open in visits to his local bank.
He also owns a fire engine and once hosed down the inside of a friend's packed pub on a Sunday afternoon.
Steve appeared in Beadle's About pranked by one of his best friends. Beadle launched a military assault in the back garden of the ex-champion motorcycle racer. Beadle's About - S02E04 Steve Parrish on Beadles About

Personal life
Parrish commonly goes by the nickname of Stavros, named by Barry Sheene back in his racing days, after the 'Stavros' character in the TV show 'Kojak' who had a similar mop of black curly hair. Divorced from wife Ruth, the couple have two children.

Parrish remarried in December 2017, to Michelle, a television outside-broadcast floor manager.

Career statistics

Grand Prix motorcycle racing

Races by year
(key) (Races in bold indicate pole position) (Races in italics indicate fastest lap)

References

External links
Bio at the BBC Press Office

1954 births
Grovewood Award winners
Living people
500cc World Championship riders
Motorsport announcers
Isle of Man TT riders